Clint Jack Heron (born 3 April 1979 in Salisbury, Rhodesia) is a Zimbabwean cricketer, who played for Western Warriors. Heron, nicknamed Torus, is a right-handed batsman and bowls right arm off-break. On his first-class debut in November 2005 he scored 84 against Tasmania, this remains his highest score in first-class cricket. His father, Jack, played ODIs for Zimbabwe. He also played for the two Scarborough Cricket Club's, in both Northern & Southern Hemispheres.

References

1979 births
Living people
Zimbabwean cricketers
Western Australia cricketers